The Norway Lutheran Church and Cemetery was located 10 miles from south of Denbigh, North Dakota and were listed on the National Register of Historic Places (NRHP) in 1994.  The NRHP listing includes the main church structure, a cemetery, and two contributing privies to the west and rear of the church, all situated on a  site.  A pyramid-shaped monument topped with an iron cross is located at the northeast corner of the cemetery and marks site of an older log church. Norwegian skier Sondre Norheim was buried in the cemetery in 1897.

The church was built in 1907 with sand bricks from the Denbigh Brick Plant.  The church was designed in a Late Gothic Revival style with a bell tower that reaches a height of 65 feet from the foundation.  It was built on a hill above the Souris River and is visible for miles.

The inclusion of the site on the NRHP was based on its historic integrity, its being "one of the best and well-maintained examples of a rural church" on the North Dakota prairie, and the use of bricks rather than wood in the construction of the church.

References

External links
 
 
 

Churches on the National Register of Historic Places in North Dakota
Carpenter Gothic church buildings in North Dakota
Churches completed in 1907
Lutheran churches in North Dakota
Norwegian-American culture in North Dakota
National Register of Historic Places in McHenry County, North Dakota
Lutheran cemeteries in the United States
1907 establishments in North Dakota
Cemeteries on the National Register of Historic Places in North Dakota